The Ghana Immigration Service (GIS) is an agency of the government of Ghana under the Ministry of the Interior. The GIS regulates examination and authorization of application for visas, entry and residence permits in Ghana. Control of foreign nationals in Ghana, Facilitation of Ghanaian passport application processing, border control and management, Refugee registration, protection and management. The service advises on and ensures the effective implementation of all laws and regulations pertaining to immigration and related issues.[1]

History
Prior to Ghana's independence from Britain, the service was known as the Immigration and Passport Unit, and was under the auspices of the Colonial Police Force of the British-ruled Gold Coast. The unit was headed by Nevile C. Hill.

After the country gained independence in 1957, the expansion of the Ghanaian economy increased the number of foreign businessmen trading in the country. Because of Ghana's lead in the emancipation of the African continent from colonial rule, the number of tourists visiting the country, particularly from neighbouring African states, also increased. To control this influx, a Cabinet decision in 1960 moved the Immigration and Passport Unit to the Ministry of the Interior as a department. The Ministry of Foreign Affairs took over the issuing of passports after the change.

Three years after the Immigration Service was moved to the Ministry of Interior, the Aliens Act 1963 (Act 160) was enacted to give legal backing to immigration operations. The Ghana Immigration Service was established in 1989 under PNDC Law 226.

Functions
The Immigration Service is charged with handling all the needs that relate to the country's dealings with non-citizens. The functions of the service are:
 to create conducive environments, through the establishment of regulatory frameworks that facilitate the entry, residence and employment of foreigners in Ghana
 to promote socio-cultural and economic development, by drawing a tangent between the promotion of tourism, foreign direct investments, international business and technological transfer without compromising on national security.

Getting a passport
The issuance of a Ghanaian passport is done by the ministry of Foreign Affairs and Regional Integration and not by the Ghana Immigration Service. The Ghana Immigration Service only plays a role in the passport application process.

Acquiring a Ghanaian passport is a six-step process:
 Purchase a passport application form from an approved point of sale (some local banks) 
 Complete the form correctly and submit it together with relevant documents to a Passport Application Center [PAC] 
 Take digital photographs and biometric data-finger-prints 
 Receive a submission receipt, with passport collection date 
 When the passport is issued, it is sent to PAC where applicants can collect their passports by presenting their submission receipt and undergoing a final biometric check. 
 
This comes at a fee of GH¢100.00 (US$70.00) for the express service or GH¢50.00 (US$35.00) for regular service. However, it is difficult to acquire a passport in the period assigned to the application form due to reasons such as shortage of passport booklets and break-down of passport printers. Shortage of passport application forms is also a hindrance to easy acquisition of the Ghanaian passport.

See also
 Ministry of Interior (Ghana)
 Refugee Board (Ghana)
 Immigration to Ghana
 Illegal immigration in Ghana

References

Ministries and Agencies of State of Ghana
Law enforcement agencies of Ghana
Law enforcement in Ghana
Government agencies established in 1989
Immigration to Ghana